The Pretendians is a Canadian television documentary film, directed by Drew Hayden Taylor and released in 2022. The film explores the issue of people falsely claiming indigenous status despite a lack of any documentable First Nations, Métis or Inuit heritage, covering the issue from a variety of facets including the production of fake indigenous art and the efforts to track down a significant false claimant of indigenous identity who has resisted any efforts to confront him on it.

The film debuted on September 30, 2022, as an episode of The Passionate Eye.

The film was a nominee for the Donald Brittain Award for best social or political television documentary at the 11th Canadian Screen Awards in 2023.

References

External links

2022 films
2022 documentary films
Canadian documentary television films
Documentary films about First Nations
English-language Canadian films
Documentary films about racism in Canada
2020s Canadian films